The men's 400 metre individual medley event at the 2015 European Games in Baku took place on 27 June at the Aquatic Palace.

Results

Heats
The heats were started at 09:52.

Final
The final was held at 17:43.

References

Men's 400 metre individual medley